The women's 100 metres hurdles at the 2000 Summer Olympics as part of the athletics programme were held at Stadium Australia on Monday 25 September and Wednesday 27 September 2000.

The top four runners in each of the initial five heats automatically qualified for the second round. The next four fastest runners from across the heats also qualified. Then the top four runners in each of the three heats of the second round qualified for the semi-finals, along with the next four fast runners across the heats. Those 16 runners competed in two heats in the semifinals, with the top four runners from each heat qualifying for the finals.

Medalists

Records

Results
All times shown are in seconds.
 Q denotes qualification by place in heat.
 q denotes qualification by overall place.
 DNS denotes did not start.
 DNF denotes did not finish.
 DQ denotes disqualification.
 NR denotes national record.
 AR denotes area/continental record.
 OR denotes Olympic record.
 WR denotes world record.
 PB denotes personal best.
 SB denotes season best.

Qualifying heats

Round 1

Round 1 – Overall

Round 2

Round 2 – Overall

Semi-finals

Semi-finals – overall

Finals

References

External links
Official Report of the 2000 Sydney Summer Olympics

Hurdles
Sprint hurdles at the Olympics
2000 in women's athletics
Women's events at the 2000 Summer Olympics